Iolaus jacksoni, the Jackson's sapphire, is a butterfly in the family Lycaenidae. It is found in Ethiopia, central and western Kenya and central Tanzania. The habitat consists of arid savanna.

The larvae feed on Plicosepalus species including P. kalachariensis, P. meridianus, P. curviflorus and P. sagittifolius.

References

Butterflies described in 1950
Iolaus (butterfly)
Butterflies of Africa